This is a list of members of the Western Australian Legislative Assembly from 2001 to 2005:

Notes

 Dr Janet Woollard was elected at the 2001 election as an Independent, but also represented the unregistered party Liberals for Forests which had been founded by her husband, former Australian Medical Association president, Dr Keith Woollard, the previous year.
 On 23 February 2001, the Liberal member for Nedlands and former Premier, Richard Court, resigned. Liberal candidate Sue Walker won the resulting by-election on 9 June 2001.
 On 12 October 2001, the Nationals' leader, member for Merredin and former Deputy Premier, Hendy Cowan, resigned to run for the Australian Senate. Nationals candidate Brendon Grylls won the resulting by-election on 24 November 2001.
 On 16 February 2004, the Liberal member for Vasse, Bernie Masters, left the party to serve as an Independent after failing to be preselected for his seat ahead of the 2005 state election.

Members of Western Australian parliaments by term